The 1990 Fusagasugá City Council election was held on Sunday, 11 March 1990. Senators, representatives, deputies, councilors and mayors were elected.

References 

1990
Regional elections